This is a list of Greece international footballers – football players who have played for the Greece national football team. All players with 50 or more official caps are listed here.

This table takes into account all Greece matches played up to and including 20 November 2022. Members of the Euro 2004-winning side are indicated by an asterisk (*). Those currently available for selection are denoted in bold.

References
 EU-Football.info Greece national football team individual records and stats

 
Association football player non-biographical articles